Robert Anthony Brucato (August 14, 1931 – November 7, 2018) was an American prelate of the Roman Catholic Church who served as auxiliary bishop of the Archdiocese of New York from 1997 to 2006.

Biography
Born in the Bronx in New York City, Brucato was educated at Cardinal Hayes High School, Cathedral College, St. Joseph’s Seminary (Dunwoodie), and Our Lady of the Lake University. He was ordained a priest on June 1, 1957, for the Roman Catholic Archdiocese of New York. He served as a chaplain in the US Air Force from 1960 to 1982, and then was appointed to a succession of church leadership roles in New York, including pastor of Holy Rosary, Staten Island (1984–1987), St. Benedict, the Bronx (1987–1994), and St. John the Evangelist, Manhattan (2001–2006). Brucato was appointed titular bishop of 'Temuniana' and auxiliary bishop of the New York Archdiocese on June 30, 1997. He was consecrated bishop on August 25, 1997, taking as his episcopal motto: My heart is ready, O Lord. He served the archdiocese as chancellor (1994–1997), vicar for pastoral guidance (1997–1999), and vicar general (1999–2006). On October 31, 2006, Brucato retired at age 75. He died on November 7, 2018, in Yonkers, New York.

See also
 

 Catholic Church hierarchy
 Catholic Church in the United States
 Historical list of the Catholic bishops of the United States
 List of Catholic bishops of the United States
 Lists of patriarchs, archbishops, and bishops

References

External links
 Roman Catholic Archdiocese of New York Official Site

1931 births
2018 deaths
People from the Bronx
Saint Joseph's Seminary (Dunwoodie) alumni
Our Lady of the Lake University alumni
Clergy from New York City
Roman Catholic bishops in New York (state)
20th-century American Roman Catholic titular bishops
21st-century American Roman Catholic titular bishops
People of the Roman Catholic Archdiocese of New York
United States Air Force chaplains